King Li of Zhou (died in 828 BC), personal name Ji Hu, was the tenth king of the Chinese Zhou Dynasty. Estimated dates of his reign are 877–841 BC or 857–842 BC (Cambridge History of Ancient China).

King Li was a corrupt and decadent king. To pay for his pleasures and vices, King Li raised taxes and caused misery among his subjects.  It is said that he barred the commoners from profiting from the communal forests and lakes. He enstated a new law which allowed him to punish anyone, by death, who dared to speak against him. King Li's bad rule soon forced many peasants and soldiers into revolt, and Li was sent into exile at a place called Zhi near Linfen (842 BC). 
His son was taken by one of his ministers and hidden. 
When Li died in exile in 828 BC, power was passed to his son.

Family
Queens:
 Shen Jiang, of the Jiang clan of Shen, a sister of the Count of Shen; the mother of Crown Prince Jing and You

Sons:
 Crown Prince Jing (d. 782 BC), ruled as King Xuan of Zhou from 827–782 BC
 Prince You (d. 771 BC), ruled as Duke Huan of Zheng from 806–771 BC
 Served as the Minister of Education of Zhou from 773–771 BC

Ancestry

See also
 Family tree of ancient Chinese emperors

Sources 

Zhou dynasty kings
9th-century BC Chinese monarchs
828 BC deaths
Year of birth unknown